The Hurricane Deck Bridge was a truss arch bridge located on Lake of the Ozarks in Camden County, Missouri. It carried Missouri Route 5 across the Osage Arm of the lake. It was perhaps one of the most distinctive features on the lake. It was the only truss-type bridge remaining on the lake. The American Institute of Steel Construction selected the bridge as the most beautiful steel span built in 1936. It was about half a mile long. The bridge was replaced in 2013.

History
Construction for the bridge began in 1934 and was completed in 1936. The bridge was one of three bridges on the lake constructed with the truss support below the deck enabling passengers to see the lake clearly. The bridge construction was similar to that of the original Niangua Bridge. Before the bridge was built, cars were moved across the lake by ferry.

At one time the bridge was originally a toll bridge. The prices to pass were 40 cents for car and driver, 5 cents for each additional passenger; cars towing trailers had to pay 60 cents plus the nickel surcharge for each additional passenger. You could also save a dime by purchasing a round trip toll.

In 2012, MODOT began construction to replace the bridge with a Delta Frame Bridge. It opened to traffic in 2013. The old Hurricane Deck Bridge was demolished in December 2013.

Similarities and differences to the I-35W Mississippi River Bridge
The Hurricane Deck Bridge was one of the most similar bridges to the I-35W Mississippi River bridge in the nation and the most identical in Missouri. However, it was in much better condition than the I-35W Mississippi River Bridge. It was of the Deck-truss construction for Vehicular traffic. The Hurricane Deck Bridge had a longer main span than the I-35W Mississippi River Bridge (462 feet vs. 458 feet). The I-35W Mississippi River bridge spanned both sides of the Mississippi River in contrast to the Hurricane Deck Bridge. Its daily traffic was about 8,000 cars daily versus 140,000 cars daily. Due to this, the Hurricane Deck Bridge had a weaker steel construction than the I-35W Bridge steel construction.

References

External links 
Bridgehunter.com

Bridges completed in 1936
Steel bridges in the United States
Lake of the Ozarks
Buildings and structures in Camden County, Missouri
Road bridges in Missouri
Former toll bridges in Missouri
Truss arch bridges in the United States